Bojan Radulović Samouković (born 29 December 1999) is a Serbian footballer who plays as a striker for Veikkausliiga club HJK on loan from  AIK.

Career
On 1 February 2018, Radulović signed for English Premier League side Brighton from Lleida in the Spanish third division.

On 28 August 2018, he was sent on loan to Spanish third division club Espanyol B.

On 31 January 2020, he was sent on loan to Alavés B in the Spanish third division.

On 17 August 2020, Radulović signed for Swedish team AIK. And on the 7th of February 2021, in a friendly game against Örebro SK, he scored his first goal in AIK, followed later by another goal by him.

On 15 February 2022, Radulović joined HJK in Finland on loan until the end of July 2022.

In July 2022 HJK bought Radulović from AIK. Radulović signed a contract lasting until the end of 2023 season.
His contract was later extended until the end of 2024.

Personal life
He is currently dating Spanish top model Laura Simon de Clair. He is the son of former footballer Radoslav Radulović, who played for Lleida.

References

External links
 

1999 births
Sportspeople from Lleida
Living people
Serbian footballers
Association football forwards
Lleida Esportiu footballers
Brighton & Hove Albion F.C. players
RCD Espanyol B footballers
Deportivo Alavés B players
AIK Fotboll players
Helsingin Jalkapalloklubi players
Segunda División B players
Allsvenskan players
Serbian expatriate footballers
Expatriate footballers in England
Serbian expatriate sportspeople in England
Expatriate footballers in Sweden
Serbian expatriate sportspeople in Sweden
Expatriate footballers in Finland
Serbian expatriate sportspeople in Finland